Nephrocytium is a genus of green algae in the family Oocystaceae.

References

 

Trebouxiophyceae genera
Trebouxiophyceae
Oocystaceae